The Jigawa State Polytechnic, Dutse is a state government higher education institution located in Dutse, Jigawa State, Nigeria. The current Rector is Aliyu Abdu Ibrahim.

History 
The Jigawa State Polytechnic, Dutse was established in 2007 after the takeover of Hussaini Adamu Polytechnic by the Federal Government of Nigeria and renamed to Hussaini Adamu Federal Polytechnic.

Courses 
The institution offers the following courses;

 Environmental Health
 Public Administration
 Electrical and Electronics
 Computer Science
 Microbiology
 Business Administration
 Statistics
 Quantity Surveying
 Building Technology
 Urban and Regional Planning
 Biochemistry
 Civil Engineering
 Accountancy
 Science Laboratory Technology
 Architecture
 Welding and Fabrication
 Mechanical Engineering
 Physics Electronics
 Estate Management

References 

Universities and colleges in Nigeria
2007 establishments in Nigeria